A car bombing occurred on 15 December 2009 in a market located in the city of Dera Ghazi Khan in the southern region of Pakistan's largest province, Punjab.  At least 33 people were reported killed and 50 more injured.

Bombing
The blast happened at around 2:45 pm local time.  About 1,000 kg of explosives were estimated to have been used. The bomb exploded in front of the main gate of the house belonging to Zulfiqar Ali Khosa a senior adviser to the chief minister of Punjab and a politician belonging to Pakistan Muslim League (N). However, he was not at home and was not injured. Mr. Khosa had recently presided over a meeting of religious leaders that had called suicide-bombing un-Islamic. The bomb caused the whole market to collapse.

Aftermath
Hassan Iqbal, the town commissioner, said "There are many people trapped in the rubble after the powerful blast demolished some 10 shops ... The rescue work is under way and we fear the toll may go up." Forty-six people were taken to the local hospital while seven critically wounded were shifted to the hospital in the nearby city of Multan. The chief minister announced financial aid of Rs 500,000 to the families of the dead, Rs 75,000 to those who were injured and Rs 50,000 to those with minor injuries.

See also
List of terrorist incidents in Pakistan since 2001

References

External links
In pictures: Pakistan market bomb, BBC, 2009-12-15
Video:Pakistan car bomb kills 22, The Daily Telegraph

2009 murders in Pakistan
21st-century mass murder in Pakistan
Mass murder in 2009
Terrorist incidents in Pakistan in 2009
Car and truck bombings in Pakistan
Crime in Punjab, Pakistan
Dera Ghazi Khan District
Attacks on buildings and structures in Pakistan
Marketplace attacks in Asia